General Motors and Ford Motor Company cooperated in 2002 to create a new automatic transaxle, designed for transverse engine applications in cars. The companies jointly committed to investing US$720 million in their manufacturing plants to support the new transmission. 

Each company will name and manufacture the transmission separately:
 Ford builds the 6F50 and 6F55  along with the 6F35 (related to the GM 6T40 transmission) at their Van Dyke Transmission Plant in Sterling Heights, Michigan, and in the future at Sharonville Transmission in Sharonville, Ohio.
 GM builds the 6T70, 6T75 and 6T80 at Warren Transmission in Warren, Michigan with production starting in July 2006.

Ford appears not to have made a public statement regarding the 6F55's maximum capabilities, but uses it in AWD in the Taurus SHO with an engine rated at 272 kW (370 PS; 365 hp) and 475 N·m (350 lb·ft) of torque (Final drive 2.77:1 standard or 3.16:1 with SHO Performance Pckage), as well as the tenth generation Lincoln Continental with an engine rated at 400 hp (298 kW; 406 PS) and 400 lb⋅ft (542 N⋅m).

The first application of the technology is in the 2007 Ford Edge and Lincoln MKX crossover SUVs, as well as the Saturn Aura sedan and the Saturn Outlook crossover. It was also used for the Pontiac G6 GTP models and the GMC Acadia models for 2007. Prior to 2009, this transmission had issues caused by a very weak 3,5,R wave plate, which made this transmission prone to failure in GM products. Updated wave plates were released for many clutches in 6T70. The old design wave plates were not stress relieved and could break with use. The updated wave plates are available under the following
part numbers:

Gear ratios:

Applications:

GM:
 2007-2010 Saturn Aura XR (LY7 V6 Option)
 2007 Pontiac G6 GTP
 2007-2009 Saturn Outlook
 2007-2017 GMC Acadia
 2008-2009 Saturn Aura XR
 2008-2009 Pontiac G6 GXP
 2008-2017 Buick Enclave
 2008-2009 Chevrolet Equinox (Sport)
 2008-2012 Chevrolet Malibu (LY7 V6 Option)
 2008-2009 Pontiac Torrent GXP
 2009-2017 Chevrolet Traverse
 2010-2017 Chevrolet Equinox (LF1, LFW, LFX V6 Option)
 2010-2016 Cadillac SRX
 2010-2016 Buick LaCrosse (LF1, LLT, LFX V6 Options)
 2012-2020 Chevrolet Impala
 2013 Cadillac XTS
 2010-2017 GMC Terrain (LF1, LFW, LFX V6 Option)

Ford:
 2007 Ford Edge
 2007 Lincoln MKX
 2008 Ford Taurus
 2008 Ford Taurus X
 2008 Mercury Sable
 2009 Ford Flex
 2009 Lincoln MKS
 2009 Ford Escape
 2009 Mercury Mariner
 2009 Mazda Tribute
 2010 Ford Fusion
 2013 Lincoln MKZ
 2010 Mercury Milan
 2010 Ford Taurus
 2011 Ford Escape
 2011 Ford Explorer
 2012 Ford Mondeo
 2015 Ford C-Max with 1.5 EcoBoost
 2016 Ford Focus with 1.5 EcoBoost
 2017 Lincoln Continental

See also
 List of Ford transmissions
 List of GM transmissions

Sources

References

6F
6T70
Motor vehicles manufactured in the United States